Kamalapuram  is a village in the Kudavasal taluk of Tiruvarur district in Tamil Nadu, India.

Demographics 

 census, Kamalapuram had a population of 1,274 with 652 males and 622 females. The sex ratio was 954. The literacy rate was 70.77.

References 

 

Villages in Tiruvarur district